Esko Malm (23 August 1940, Valkeakoski) is a Finnish former footballer and manager who earned 1 cap at international match in 1963. but the match is not recognized as full internationals match by FIFA. At club level Malm played for FC Haka between 1958–72. After playing career he became a manager of Haka and in 1979 he was chosen as a manager of Finland.

References
Veikkausliiga Hall of Fame
eu-football.info

1940 births
People from Valkeakoski
Finnish footballers
Finnish football managers
Finland international footballers
Finland national football team managers
Living people
Association football midfielders
Sportspeople from Pirkanmaa